The 1925–26 Kansas Jayhawks men's basketball team represented the University of Kansas during the 1925–26 college men's basketball season.

Roster
Wilferd Belgard
Glenn Burton
Clifford Campbell
William Crosswhite
Fred Daniels
Gale Gordon
James Hill
Gregory Hodges
Leo Lattin
Albert Peterson
Herbert Proudfit
Harold Schmidt
Harold Zuber

Schedule

References

Kansas Jayhawks men's basketball seasons
Kansas
Kansas
Kansas